Desnoes and Geddes Limited (D&G) is a Jamaican brewer and beverage producer. It was formed in 1918 by Eugene Peter Desnoes and Thomas Hargreaves Geddes who combined their two shops into one business.

Products
D&G produces one of Jamaica's best-known exports, Red Stripe beer, and also exports Old Jamaica Ginger Beer. It brews other malt beverages for the local market under the brand names Red Stripe Light, Dragon Stout, Malta (nonalcoholic), Smirnoff Ice, Guinness, and Heineken.

Dragon Stout
Dragon was introduced in 1920. Its brewing process utilises a Grade A two-row European malt, caramel, roasted malt and dark brown sugar.

Ownership
Only a small portion of D&G's shares are publicly traded. From 1993 until autumn 2015, Guinness and Smirnoff owner Diageo owned a controlling stake in the company. In October 2015, Dutch brewer Heineken acquired Diageo's stake taking its stake to 73.3%. It stated it would launch a full bid for the shares it did not own.

D&G also made soft drinks, including the popular Ting, but sold that division to PepsiCo in 1999.

References

Diageo
Companies based in Kingston, Jamaica
Beer in the Caribbean
Food and drink companies established in 1918
1918 establishments in Jamaica
Jamaican brands